"Someday I'll Be Saturday Night" is a song by American rock band Bon Jovi from their 1994 greatest hits album, Cross Road. Released as a single on February 13, 1995, the song reached number seven on the UK Singles Chart and became a top-10 hit in Australia, Finland, Iceland, and Ireland.

Lyrical content
"Someday I'll Be Saturday Night" is about optimism in the face of adversity. The song's first verse introduces the characters Jim who struggles to find employment and is forced to sleep in his car, and Billie-Jean who was abused by her foster father and has turned to prostitution at the age of sixteen (remarking that the street-life ain't much better but at least I'm getting paid), mourning the loss of her childhood.

The song's pre-chorus and chorus refer to life, luck and survival, looking forward to when times are better (the eponymous Saturday Night). It is one of the few songs recorded by the band to feature explicit lyrics, though only as a single word.

Live performances
The song is considered to be a fan favourite and a popular example of Bon Jovi's upbeat anthemic choruses taking on deeper meaning during the 1990s. It is often performed live and has been refined in several different versions over the years. For example, there is a 1995 recording from Melbourne on the band's One Wild Night Live 1985–2001 live CD, where Jon Bon Jovi sings the intro slowly, encouraging the crowd to join in before the band come in and return the song to tempo. This version also features an extended interlude. On the Lost Highway Tour the song had been played in a version closer to the original studio recording, but for The Circle Tour, it is played in a slower acoustic style.  The song was performed on select dates of the Because We Can Tour either in its slow acoustic arrangement, or in its original arrangement.

Track list
 "Someday I'll Be Saturday Night" (Jon Bon Jovi, Richie Sambora, Desmond Child) - 4:39
 "Good Guys Don't Always Wear White" (Jon Bon Jovi, Richie Sambora) - 4:29

German CD single
The German version of the CD single featured two more live songs recorded December 6, 1994, in St. Denis Theatre, Montreal, Canada.
Desmond Child is given writing credits on "Someday I'll be Saturday Night".  On at least one printing line of the single the title track was accidentally replaced with a live version of the same song.

 "Someday I'll be Saturday Night" (Jon Bon Jovi, Richie Sambora, Desmond Child) - 4:38   [Running time of the live version is 4:45]
 "Good Guys Don't Always Wear White" (Jon Bon Jovi, Richie Sambora) - 4:27
 "With a Little Help from My Friends" 'Live' (Lennon–McCartney) - 6-14
 "Always" 'Live' (Jon Bon Jovi) - 5-52

B-side
The song "Good Guys Don't Always Wear White" is featured in the movie The Cowboy Way. Although Bon Jovi also released a music video to the song it was never released as a single. Aside from the "Someday I'll Be Saturday Night" single it can also be found on the Special Edition Bonus CD of the compilation Cross Road and the box set 100,000,000 Bon Jovi Fans Can't Be Wrong.

Charts

Weekly charts

Year-end charts

References

Bon Jovi songs
1994 songs
1995 singles
Mercury Records singles
Songs written by Jon Bon Jovi